Jalainur District or Zhalainuo'er District (Mongolian:   Залайнуур тойрог Jalainaɣur toɣoriɣ), an urban district under Manzhouli's administration, is listed as a district of Hulunbuir officially and located in the northeast of Inner Mongolia.

Transportation 
Jalainur's railway station is the midway stop between Manzhouli, the port city that stands close to the Russian border and Hailar District the seat of Hulunbuir. It is on the famous Manchuria branch of the Trans-Siberian express route and China National Highway 301.

Tourist attractions 
A scale model of Moscow's Cathedral of the Intercession of the Most Holy Theotokos on the Moat (popularly known as Saint Basil's Cathedral) has been built in Jalainur. The building houses a science museum.

References

External links 
Official website of Jalainur District Government
Post codes of Inner Mongolia (English)

Populated places established in 2013
Hulunbuir